Vincent Patrick O'Rourke (19 May 192214 July 2011) was a World War II United States naval aviator in the Pacific theater and two time recipient of the Navy Cross, the Navy's second highest award for valor after the Medal of Honor.

Background and education 
Vincent Patrick O'Rourke was born on 19 May 1922 in New York City to Francis and Alice O'Rourke. He grew up in Forest Hills, Queens. In 1940, he began studying Aeronautical Engineering at the Brooklyn Polytechnic Institute. In 1954, he received a Bachelor of Science degree in Aeronautical Engineering from the Naval Postgraduate School. He also received a Master of Science degree from Purdue University. He also graduated from the Naval Test Pilot School and the Armed Forces Staff College. He was married to Harriett Julia Sokal (1922–2007) of Middle Village, Queens for 63 years.

Navy career 
O'Rourke enlisted in the Navy 27 July 1942 as an aviation cadet. He became an Ensign in October 1943. He served with VF-74 aboard  the Mediterranean theater. On 9 July 1944, while he was landing on Kasaan Bay, his TBM-1C hit the catwalk and severely damaged a wing, but there were no injuries.

He served as a pilot with torpedo squadron 47 (VT-47) on  flying a TBM-3 Avenger and was awarded a number of medals for valor including two Navy Cross medals and a Bronze star. LTJG O'Rourke received his first Navy Cross was for his attack on the Japanese fleet at Kobe Bay on 19 March 1945. He bombed a large aircraft carrier under heavy anti-aircraft fire and smoke-screening. His second Navy Cross related to his role in the attack on the Japanese cruiser Tone during the 28 July 1945 attack on Kure Harbor. O'Rourke flew just over 216 hours on 33 strike missions during VT-47's 18 March 1945 to 15 August 1945 combat deployment aboard Bataan.

He served as executive officer of fighter squadron VF-124 and Commanding officer of fighter squadrons VF-96 and VF-142 prior to 1964.

In 1964, Commander O'Rourke was executive officer of  after serving there as Air Officer. He became a captain in December 1964.

O'Rourke retired to Coronado, California, in July 1974 and was a consultant in the US, Europe and Middle East. He died 14 July 2011 in Coronado. He was buried at Arlington National Cemetery, section 55, grave 3495 on 11 October 2012.

Awards 
During his career in the Navy, O'Rourke received the Navy Cross with Gold Star for second award, Legion of Merit, Distinguished Flying Cross, Bronze Star with valor device, Air Medal with 4 Gold Stars for subsequent awards and the Meritorious Service Medal.

Award citations 

The Commander of 1st Carrier Task Force awarded O'Rourke the Navy Cross for actions 19 March 1945 during a raid on Kobe Bay:

The Commander of 2nd Carrier Task Force, Pacific awarded O'Rourke the Navy Cross for actions on 28 July 1945 during a raid on Kure Harbor and his role in sinking Japanese cruiser Tone.

Dates of rank 
 1 October 1943 Ensign.
 1 January 1949 Lieutenant.
 1 July 1959 Commander.
 1 December 1964 Captain.
 July 1974 Captain, Retired.

Bibliography 
  (Masters Thesis)

References

Further reading 
 Relating to bombing of the partially constructed Unryū-class aircraft carrier Ikoma at Kobe Bay: 
 
 Relating to March 19, 1945, strike: 
 Relating to March 19, 1945, strike: 
 Photo of Kobe Bay raid from Bataan after action report: 
 Air Group 47 photos on Bataan from USS Bataan history book:

External links 
 
 

1922 births
2011 deaths
People from Forest Hills, Queens
People from Coronado, California
Polytechnic Institute of New York University alumni
Purdue University alumni
Naval Postgraduate School alumni
Joint Forces Staff College alumni
United States Naval Test Pilot School alumni
United States Naval Aviators

Recipients of the Navy Cross (United States)
Recipients of the Legion of Merit
Recipients of the Distinguished Flying Cross (United States)
Recipients of the Air Medal
United States Navy personnel of World War II
Military personnel from California